Satellite Sky is the final album by Mark Heard, released in 1992, on Heard's own Fingerprint Records, shortly before his death.

The album, which was almost entirely written on a mandolin, prominently features Heard's own 1939 National Steel electric mandolin.

Track listing
All songs written by Mark Heard. 
 "Tip of My Tongue" – 4:22
 "Satellite Sky" – 3:48
 "The Big Wheels Roll" – 4:02
 "Orphans of God" – 6:22 
 "Another Day In Limbo" – 4:31
 "Language of Love" – 4:06
 "Freight Train to Nowhere" – 4:30
 "Long Way Down" – 4:42
 "A Broken Man" – 5:42
 "Love Is So Blind" – 3:15
 "Hammers and Nails" – 4:41
 "We Know Too Much" – 5:58
 "Lost on Purpose" – 4:20 
 "Nothing But the Wind" – 3:32
 "Treasure of the Broken Land" – 6:22

Personnel 
The band
 David Raven – drums
 Michael Been – bass guitar
 Fergus Jemison Marsh – stick
 Mark Heard – electric steel mandolin, electric guitars, acoustic guitars and mandolins, Hammond organ, accordion and harmonica. 
 Buddy Miller – electric guitar
 Jack Sherman – electric guitar 
 Mark Goldenberg – electric guitar 
 David Miner – standup bass
 Jim Goodwin – horns
 David Baker – African percussion
 Doug Berch]] – hammered dulcimer, mountain dulcimer
 Sam Phillips – backing vocals
 Pam Dwinell-Miner – backing vocals
 Dan Russell – backing vocals
 Joel Russell – backing vocals

Production notes
 Mark Heard – producer for Fingerprint Productions, engineer, mixing at Fingerprint Recorders, design, artwork
 Dan Russell – co-producer
 Jim Scott – co-producer
 Chuck Long – production associate
 Jim Scott – engineer at Dodge City, Mama Jo's and Bedrock, Los Angeles
 Jeff Shannon- assistant engineer
 Conrad Kalil- assistant engineer
 Richard Benoit- assistant engineer
 Joel Russell- assistant engineer
 Chris Morris – assistant engineer (misspelled as Chris Morse in liner notes)
 Patrick House – photography
 Fingerprint – digital editing, graphics
 Design by Fran Larson – frame

References 

1992 albums
Mark Heard albums